Euxoa cognita is a moth of the family Noctuidae. It is found in central Asia, including western Turkestan.

References 

Euxoa
Moths described in 1881